Anne-Lise Coste (born 1973) is a French painter living in Orthoux (south of France).

Early life 
Anne-Lise Coste was born in 1973 in Marignane, near Marseille.

Work 
Coste's paintings and drawings can bring to mind the urgency of graffiti. She says about her work “having faith in the first gesture.” With a language influenced by Dadaism, the artist expresses both subjective emotions and societal criticism. Coste has had solo exhibitions in international institutions and galleries, including  (St. Gallen, 2006), Eleven Rivington (New York, 2013), Galería NoguerasBlanchard (Barcelona, 2010, Madrid, 2015), Centre régional d'art contemporain Occitanie (fr) (Sète, 2019).

Collections 

 Migros Museum of Contemporary Art
Barcelona Museum of Contemporary Art
 Fondation pour l'art contemporain Salomon (fr)
 Frac des Pays de la Loire
 NoguerasBlanchard

Bibliography 

 Non, Zurich: Edition Patrick Frey, 2003, 
Poemabout, Zürich: Edition Patrick Frey, 2005, 
 Remember, Zürich: Edition Patrick Frey, 2008, 
 Où suis-je, Zürich: Edition Patrick Frey, 2014, 
Oil paintings and pastel drawings, Zürich: Nieves, 2017, 
 Sors le monde, Lyon: H Editions, 2019,

References

External links 

 Anne-Lise Coste website

1973 births
Living people
20th-century French painters
21st-century French painters
People from Bouches-du-Rhône
French women painters
20th-century French women
21st-century French women